Skrbeň is a municipality and village in Olomouc District in the Olomouc Region of the Czech Republic. It has about 1,200 inhabitants.

Notable people
Berthold Hatschek (1854–1941), Austrian zoologist

References

Villages in Olomouc District